Matei Kalpakov is a Bulgarian sprint canoer who competed in the mid-1980s. He won a bronze medal in the C-2 10000 m event at the 1985 ICF Canoe Sprint World Championships in Mechelen.

References

Bulgarian male canoeists
Living people
Year of birth missing (living people)
ICF Canoe Sprint World Championships medalists in Canadian